Moodnopsis portoricensis is a species of snout moth in the genus Moodnopsis. It is found in Puerto Rico.

References

Moths described in 1956
Phycitinae